The Dillingham House is a historic house located at Main Street (Massachusetts Route 6A) in Brewster, Massachusetts. It is located just northeast of Main Street's junction with Newcomb Road.

Description and history 
The oldest portion of this -story timber-frame saltbox is said to date to about 1660, making it one of the oldest buildings on Cape Cod. The saltbox style, although common in other parts of Massachusetts, is also quite rare on the Cape. The house was probably built by Joseph Wing, and was purchased by John Dillingham, a Quaker, in 1667.

The house was listed on the National Register of Historic Places on April 30, 1976.

See also
List of the oldest buildings in Massachusetts

References

Houses completed in 1660
Houses in Barnstable County, Massachusetts
National Register of Historic Places in Barnstable County, Massachusetts
1660 establishments in Massachusetts
Houses on the National Register of Historic Places in Barnstable County, Massachusetts